The 1980 Tipperary Senior Hurling Championship was the 90th staging of the Tipperary Senior Hurling Championship since its establishment by the Tipperary County Board in 1887.

Kilruane MacDonaghs were the defending champions.

On 28 September 1980, Roscrea won the championship after a 3-11 to 2-13 defeat of Kilruane MacDonaghs in the final at Semple Stadium. It was their sixth championship title overall and their first title since 1973. It remains their last championship triumph.

Results

Quarter-finals

Semi-finals

Final

Championship statistics

Top scorers

Overall

In a single game

References

Tipperary
Tipperary Senior Hurling Championship